Horse McDonald (born Sheena Mary McDonald, 22 November 1958) is a Scottish singer-songwriter. She is noted mainly for her rich, sonorous voice, and The Scotsman referred to her as "One of Scotland's all-time great vocalists, also possessed of a keen songwriting intelligence".

Career
McDonald was born on 22 November 1958 in Newport on Tay, Fife, Scotland.

In the 1980s, she toured with Tina Turner and BB King. To celebrate the 20th anniversary of her debut album The Same Sky, Horse and her band played the entire album on a tour of the United Kingdom in October and November 2010.

In 2011, McDonald performed a duet with Heather Peace, on a song they wrote together, Beechwood avenue.

McDonald toured in March 2011, playing an acoustic set with the full band. These concerts featured "exclusive previews of several new songs from the upcoming ninth album, as well as Horse standards and rare B sides".

She was also slated to appear in the soundtrack of the  UK independent film, About Her.

McDonald appeared on the 2012 charity single 'It Does Get Better' created by The L Project.  The single benefitted LGBT charities and was written in response to the suicide of LGBT teenagers.

She performed a one-off show at the Barrowland, Glasgow 2 March 2013 with the Scottish Chamber Orchestra to celebrate the twentieth anniversary of God's Home Movie and the release of her ninth studio album HOME.

In January 2013 she married her long-term partner, Alanna, in the town of Lanark, Scotland, where she lived as a teenager.

Discography

Albums
The Same Sky (Capitol, 1990) – UK Number 44
God's Home Movie (MCA, 1993) – UK Number 42
Both Sides (Randan, 2000) (with the Scottish Chamber Orchestra)
Hindsight ... It's a Wonderful Thing (Randan, 2001)
Only All of Me (Randan, 2003)
Coveted (Randan, 2004)
Red Haired Girl (Kosmic Music, 2007)
Coming Up For Air (Randan, 2009)
Home (Randan, 5 August 2013)
Odds & Sods (Randan, 2015)

Singles

Solo:
"Sometimes I..." (1999)
"Same Old, Same Old" (2006)
"Something Wicked This Way Comes" (2010)
"I Am" (2012) Rocket Science Remix
"Home" ( Randan, 1 Jul 2013)

References

External links

Official website

1958 births
Living people
Lesbian singers
Lesbian songwriters
People from Newport-on-Tay
Scottish lesbian musicians
Scottish LGBT singers
Scottish LGBT songwriters
Scottish women guitarists
20th-century Scottish women singers
Scottish women songwriters
Scottish soul musicians
20th-century Scottish LGBT people
21st-century Scottish LGBT people
21st-century Scottish women singers